Metlichina Ridge (‘Hrebet Metlichina’ \'hre-bet me-'tli-chi-na\) is the partly ice-free ridge extending 12.6 km in northwest-southeast direction, 3.9 km wide and rising to 980 m (St. Angelariy Peak) on Oscar II Coast, Graham Land in Antarctica.  It is bounded by Punchbowl Glacier to the northeast, Exasperation Inlet to the south and Minzuhar Glacier to the southwest, and linked to Forbidden Plateau to the northwest.

The feature is named after the settlements of Metlichina in northeastern and southern Bulgaria.

Location
British mapping in 1974.

Maps
 Antarctic Digital Database (ADD). Scale 1:250000 topographic map of Antarctica. Scientific Committee on Antarctic Research (SCAR), 1993–2016.

References
 Metlichina Ridge. SCAR Composite Antarctic Gazetteer.
 Bulgarian Antarctic Gazetteer. Antarctic Place-names Commission. (details in Bulgarian, basic data in English)

External links
 Metlichina Ridge. Copernix satellite image

Ridges of Graham Land
Oscar II Coast
Bulgaria and the Antarctic